Pocock Racing Shells is a Seattle, Washington-based racing shells manufacturer, founded in 1911. Pocock Racing Shells is the oldest rowing shell manufacturer in the world.

History
Pocock Racing Shells was founded in Seattle, Washington in 1911. The roots of the company began in England back in the 1800s. Founder George Pocock grew up in England, where his father was the head boat builder for prestigious Eton College at Windsor around the turn of the century.  As a young man, George raced single shells on the famed River Thames. At one of these races he won £50, and with the money purchased passage for himself and his brother, Dick, on a cattle boat bound for Canada. In 1911, on George’s 20th birthday, they arrived in Vancouver, British Columbia, with $20 in their pockets and a dream of building fine racing boats. They were commissioned to build two single sculling boats for the Vancouver Rowing Club’s boathouse, without moorage, and found that at low tide they rested precariously on the mud flats. During the ensuing year, they nearly starved.

Help arrived that winter when University of Washington rowing coach Hiram Boardman Conibear convinced the brothers to come to Seattle and build boats for the university after hearing about their fine work in Canada. In 1916 the shell building business was still struggling, and they began building pontoons for William E. Boeing’s new airplane company, Boeing. George eventually became foreman of the assembly department, Dick became boat-builder for Yale University, and their father returned to England.

In 1922 George returned to the University of Washington to build boats again, and in 1923, the unknown Washington rowing team went east and won the national sport rowing championship in a Pocock boat. For the next 50 years George built racing shells for nearly every racing college in the country and several abroad. His reputation spread as he strived to maintain the highest possible quality at a price that even small colleges or high schools could afford. Pocock Racing Shells went on to win many national sport rowing and Olympic championships.

Upon George’s death in 1976, the Lake Union-based company was taken over by his son, Stan. Stan grew up in Seattle, was an oarsman at the University of Washington and graduated with a degree in Engineering. In the late 1960s, management of the company became Stan’s responsibility while George devoted himself to constructing cedar single shells.

In addition to his role as a boat builder, Stan also was a successful rowing coach. In addition to coaching at the University of Washington from 1947-1955, he was the first coach for Lake Washington Rowing Club upon its formation in 1958, and coached several gold medal winning crews in the 1956 and 1960 Olympic Games. In 1956 Stan began experimenting with fiberglass construction. In 1961 he built the first ever fiberglass rowing boat - a wherry. By 1979 Stan was running the shop and experimenting with ideas that were ahead of their time. He was first in many areas, including the development of a successful wood and glass laminated composite oar, molded seat tops and adjustable oarlock height spacers. Impressed with innovations in composite engineering from aerospace industries, and adding his own experience to that of the Boeing engineers, he developed the first line of all carbon fiber monocoque racing shells in 1981.

In 1985, Stan passed on the Pocock torch to long-time family friend Bill Tytus. Bill met the Pocock family as a child, and became a frequent visitor to the shop. In the late 1960s, he was an avid sculler while pursuing his degrees from the University of Washington and Harvard University. In 1969, he placed second in the Diamond Challenge Sculls event at the Henley Royal Regatta, and was a member of the U.S. National Team from 1969-1971. He is still active in the sport, teaming with Frank Cunningham for the past 15 years to coach scullers at Lake Washington Rowing Club.

Bill Tytus is the currently owner and President of Pocock Racing Shells, and oversees the day-to-day operation of the Everett, WA shop. Pocock Racing Shells builds composite racing shells for colleges, clubs, and high schools in North America. In 1998 he introduced the "Hypercarbon" laminate schedule, which is the proprietary construction used in the racing shells that Pocock builds.

Models
Small Hull xVIII
Large Hull xVIII
Hypercarbon V8
Standard Line E8
Standard Line C8
Standard Line M8
Hypercarbon K4+
Hypercarbon K4x
Standard Line K4+
Standard Line K4x
Standard Line C4+
Standard Line R4+
Hypercarbon K2x/-
Standard Line K2x/-
Hypercarbon K1x
Standard Line K1x

Rowing Foundation
In perpetuating the legacy and ideals of George Pocock, the George Pocock Rowing Foundation, a 501(c)(3) non-profit organization located in Seattle, serves as a community resource for the support and advancement of the sport of rowing in the Northwest. Established in 1984 the foundation is active in objectively promoting an awareness of rowing in the Pacific Northwest through the development of new rowing programs, providing rowing opportunities for at risk children and adults in the community, and sponsoring men and women training for the U.S. National Rowing Team.

External links 
Pocock Racing Shells Official Website
George Pocock Rowing Foundation
Seattle's Pocock Rowing Center

References 

Rowing equipment manufacturers
Manufacturing companies based in Seattle
Manufacturing companies established in 1911
Design companies established in 1911
1911 establishments in Washington (state)